Sir James Colquhoun, 3rd Baronet, of Luss (28 September 1774 – 3 February 1836) was the Member of Parliament (MP) for Dumbartonshire from 1799 to 1806.

Colquhoun was a Scottish aristocratic major in 1799 when he married the writer Janet Sinclair. He did not support her religious zeal. He was the heir to an estate in Dunbartonshire. It has been proposed that Colquhoun and his wife were the basis for the characters of Rabina and George Colwan in Hogg's The Private Memoirs and Confessions of a Justified Sinner.

References 

1774 births
1836 deaths
Members of the Parliament of Great Britain for Scottish constituencies
British MPs 1796–1800
Members of the Parliament of the United Kingdom for Scottish constituencies
UK MPs 1801–1802
UK MPs 1802–1806
Baronets in the Baronetage of Great Britain